Khmer traditional clothing refers to the traditional styles of dress worn by the Khmer people from ancient times to the present.

Bottoms

The sampot is the traditional garment of the Khmer, still popular among men and women of the lower class. It is basically a sarong similar to those worn in neighboring Laos and Thailand, with slight variations. Measuring approximately one and a half meters long, the two ends of the cloth are sewn together to form a tubular garment that is worn over the lower half of the body, extending to the ankles. The wearer ties a knot of excess cloth in front to secure it at the waist. The  varies in color, material and dimensions, depending on the gender and social class of the wearer.

Historically the  dates back to the Funan era, in which a king, at the request of Chinese envoys, ordered his subjects to cover themselves.

Sampot Chang Kben 
Sampot chang kben was the preferred choice of women of the upper and middle classes for day-to-day wear, although the practice died out at the beginning of the twentieth century. It dates back to ancient Cambodia, when deities were said to wear it. Scholars consider it ultimately to derive from the Indian Dhoti. Unlike the typical , it is more like pants than a skirt. It is a rectangular piece of cloth three metres long and one metre wide. 

It is worn by wrapping it around the waist, stretching it away from the body and twisting the knot. The knot is then pulled between the legs and held by a metal belt. Men may also wear it, but in traditional patterns suited to their gender.

Sampot Tep Apsara 

Sampot Tep Apsara is a type of sampot from the Khmer Empire era associated with courtly Apsaras. Its depiction can still be seen on the bas-reliefs of Angkor Wat. Generally, the sampot tep apsara is both knotted at the waist and secured with a belt. Long pleats are gathered at the front, running the full length to the wearer's ankles.

The sampot tep apsara is actually knotted twice at the waist, one on the left and one on the right; the left knot is longer, while the right knot is more decorative. Scholars trace this garment to the sari of India. Today, the sampot tep apsara is worn by traditional dancers in modern Cambodia.

Sampot Chang Samloy 
Sampot chang samloy is a long unisex daytime skirt. The word  initially referred to colour, which in ancient times was always black; now it is sometimes used for a thin, soft fabric with decoration and pattern similar to the sarong Batik, although the garment may be smaller. This style of dress needs a knot to secure it, making it similar to the sampot chang kben. However, it also needs a fold at the left or right side, like a sarong. Scholars consider this style of dress to derive from the Indian Lunghi. The  was commonly worn in the post-Angkor era.

Sampot Charobab 

 is a long silk skirt embroidered with gold thread. It is worn by women in Khmer classical dance, by newlyweds and by the character of Mae Huo in the Cambodian Royal Ploughing Ceremony.Many of traditional styles are influenced from Siam during Ayutthaya and Rattanakosin periods

Sampot Seng 
 is a short embroidered silk skirt.

Sampot Sesay 
 is a monochromatic skirt with a band along the lower hem embroidered in gold or silver. Today, this skirt is more popular among Laotian women than among the Khmer.

Sampot Lbaeuk 
 is a long silk-embroidered skirt. The  was mostly worn by Cambodian nobility in the Longvek era.

Sampot Anlonh 
 is a long skirt with vertical stripes, commonly worn by old people or farmers in the countryside. The  is similar to the Burmese Longyi.

Tops 

There are many tops or shirts worn in Cambodia. The traditional  was invented at the end of the Khmer Empire at the turn of the 14th century.

Av Chang Pong
Av chang pong is a piece of fabric in any color worn by Khmer people at the end of the 13th century. It was primarily worn by women, who started using it to cover their chest, leaving only the stomach uncovered. This method, called "Chang Pol", covered the back and each side of the fabric to join at the chest and was rolled up and tied. It then evolved into , a thick and strong fabric cover on the chest, which hugged the body closely. 

Sometimes, the common style of wearing this garment was similar to that of the Av Chang Pok. However, Av Tronum did not leave as much skin uncovered as av chang pok. The av tronum was popular among rich young women in the Chatomok era; today it is an important costume in Khmer classical dance.

Av Bampong
Av Bampong means tube skirt in English due to its appearance as a long tube, close to the body at the neck from which it hangs easily. Av Bupok is a long shirt, more like a dress than the regular shirt, similar to the Vietnamese Ao Dai, the Indian Kurta and the Malaysian baju kurung. Generally, it has a collar with a button at the neck to fasten from neck to chest like a Kurta while it normally narrows at the waist like a baju kurung. 

It has a small hidden cut at the hem like an av dai which allows the lower part of the shirt to spread out. Most such tops are knee-length, just a few stopping at the thigh. This top was famously worn by rich women in the Longvek era in Oudong.

Av Dai Puon
Av Dai Paong is a traditional blouse from the Longvek era. Dai paong means short puffed sleeves. This top usually had a row of buttons down the front. Only the richest women of that era could have afforded one.

Av Phnat Kbach
Av Phnat Kbach is a formal shirt primarily worn by wealthy young women. It is often adorned with a row of pleats with floral decorations and often paired with a collar and sleeve hems in the same style. The period in which this shirt was invented is not known. This top is quite similar to a Burmese style, and may have been influenced by Burmese culture.

Av Neang Nov
Av neang nov is a long-sleeved shirt for women.

Av Bar Bov
Av Bar Bov is an sleeveless coat worn over the Av Neang Nov and Av Dai Paong. It has double buttons at the pleat. The name of Av Bar Bov means literally lotus leaves in Thai.

Av Pak

Av Pak is a recently popular fashion blouse worn by Cambodian women. It is the Khmer version of the Javanese Kebaya with plain stamped cotton, elaborately hand-painted and embroidered with silk and gold thread. In the past, this kind of top was pure white in colour with a high, fully embroidered collar. Today, it has more gold thread and embroidery in several colors. It also has a narrow cut very popular with young and middle-aged Khmer women, to the point where it has been used as a modern costume affirming national identity when worn both inside and outside the country. It is usually combined with a sampot hol, occasionally with a sampot chang kben.

Krama

Cambodians traditionally wear a checkered scarf called a krama. The krama has been a feature of Khmer dress since the first-century reign of Preah Bath Hun Tean, although it is unclear exactly when the krama became fashionable in the street.

The krama is one trait that distinguishes the Khmer from their Thai, Vietnamese, and Laotian neighbours.  It is used for many purposes, including for style, for protection from the hot sun, as an aid for one's feet when climbing trees, as a hammock for infants, as a towel, or as a sarong.  A krama can also be easily shaped into a small child's doll for play.  Under the Khmer Rouge, all Khmer were forced to wear a checkered krama.

The conical bamboo hat is worn by many, especially by workers in the countryside to shade them from the sun.

Textiles
In addition to their stylistic features,  especially are differentiated by the fabric they are made from.

Silk weaving in Cambodia has a long history. The practice dates to as early as the late 13th century. According to Zhou Daguan's record, "None of the locals produces silk. Nor do the women know how to stitch and darn with a needle and thread. The only thing they can do is weave cotton from Kapok. Even then they cannot spin the yarn, but just use their hands to gather the cloth into strands. 

They do not use a loom for weaving. Instead they just wind one end of the cloth around their waist, hang the other end over a window, and use a bamboo tube as a shuttle". Interestingly, Zhoumentioned that people from Siam brought silk production into Angkor, "In recent years people from Siam have come to live in Cambodia, and unlike the locals they engage in silk production. The mulberrytrees they grow and the silkworms they raise all came from Siam. They themselves weave the silk into clothes made of a black patterned satiny silk".There are three important silk textiles in Cambodia: (1) the ikat silks ( in Khmer), or hol; (2) the twill-patterned silks; and (3) the weft ikat textiles. Patterns are made by tying natural or synthetic fibers on the weft threads and then dyeing them. This process is repeated with different colors until the patterns firm and cloth is woven. Red, yellow, green, blue and black are the most commonly used colors. Colours were traditionally allocated to different days of the week: starting at Monday, they were dark yellow; purple; green; light green; dark blue; dark red; and bright red.

The Sompot Hol is used as a lower garment as is the Sompot Chong Kben. The Pidan Hol is used as a ceremonial hanging for religious purposes.

Sot silk weaving has been an important part of Cambodia's cultural past. It is documented that people in Takéo Province have woven silk since the Funan era; written records, bas-reliefs and the report of the Chinese emissary Zhou Daguan show that looms have been used to weave sompots since ancient times. Women learned to apply highly complex methods and intricate patterns. The hol or ikat method involves dyeing patterns on silk before it is woven. A method unique to Cambodian weavers is the uneven twill technique. Although it is unclear why they adopted such an unusual method, the ancient bas-reliefs provide a detailed look at fabric patterns and pleats. Silk-woven pieces are used to decorate temples; heirloom pieces are worn at weddings and funerals.

Raising silkworms in Cambodia is mainly women's work. The knowledge of raising worms, harvesting the silk thread, and processing the thread into correct quality yarn for weaving has been passed down through generations. However, due to the neglect of mulberry plantations during nearly 30 years of war, Cambodia's "golden" native yarn production fell from around 150 tonnes a year in the 1960s to about six tonnes a year today. All silk textiles woven in Cambodia prior to the war were woven from Khmer Golden Silk, so-called because of its natural yellow colour. Today Cambodia produces around 10 per cent of the silk used: most comes from Vietnam and China.

Sampot Phamuong 

Sampot Phamuong are, with many different variations, traditional Khmer textiles. They are single colored and twill-woven. There are currently 52 colors used in sampot phamuong. The phamuong charobab is a luxurious fabric woven with up to 22 needles. The most valued silk used to create the phamuong is Cambodian yellow silk, known for its fine quality. New phamuong designs draw inspiration from ancient silk patterns and usually contain floral and geometrical motifs. Popular variations include rabak, chorcung, anlonh, kaneiv and bantok. The word phamuong comes from the Siamese language, in which pha means fabric and mung means indigo.

Sampot Hol 

Sampot hol is a typical traditional textile. There are two kinds of sampot hol; one is a wrapping skirt that uses a technique called chang kiet (the other uses a twill weave. Influenced by the Indian patola, it has become a genuine Khmer art style after hundreds of years. The sampot hol comes in over 200 patterns and three to five colors (yellow, red, brown, blue and green). There are four principal variations: sampot hol, sampot hol poa, sampot hol kben and kampot kol katong. Patterns are usually formed with animal, geometric or floral motifs.

Sampot hol was introduced as a ceremonial skirtcloth to the Thai court as sompak poom or pha poom in the 19th century.

Cambodian clothing styles by period 

The Khmer sampot with its many variations was generally regarded as the national dress of Cambodia.  But variations in clothes sharply indicated position in a firm social hierarchy, as well as regional and period changes. New fashions were slowly passed down to the generations, though some clothing styles disappeared only to be restored in a later period.

Funan Era (68—550)

Clothing styles in the first Cambodian period was overwhelmingly influenced by India, at least until the Khmer king at the request of Chinese envoys ordered his subjects to wear the sompot. Despite some similarities, men and women wore distinct clothing styles.

Men: All the males in the region wore Indian styled clothing. The people in the region generally wore sampot chang kben but much more Indian looking than today. The King, his family and nobles had their own style of Sarabat textile imported from China. A bas-relief shows wealthy people wearing the cloth like a Dhoti, winding it around the upper body and tying the waist with a thin piece of cloth.

Noblemen and royalty wore the sampot chang Kben in everyday life with the chest exposed. Varieties of Yantra tattooing in ancient Khmer script were inscribed on their bodies for spiritual protection. With the spread of Hinduism across the country, the King wore a crown with different colored corners to show his royalty.

Women wore "brocaded sarongs", probably sampots in different colours, held at the waist with a gold belt. The most useful sompot would have been a Sompot Sarabap, made from the expensive light silk of the country. This left the upper body naked, but women would have added a Sarong Kor (see below) as a collar to display their jewellery, including big triangular earrings of wood or gold, or earrings shaped like bracelets.

Short, straight hairstyles were worn by non-royal courtiers; the chignon or topknot was typically reserved for royalty.

Unlike the rich, the poor wore a simple straw skirt around the waist or one made of animal skin or cotton. They had no jewellery but wore hairstyles similar to those of the rich.

Chenla (550—802)
()

Clothing styles in this period bore certain resemblances to those in Funan; however, according to the bas-belief at Vat Phou, a surviving ruin of Chenla, its national costume differed significantly from that of Funan excepting the headdress worn at that time only by the king.

Men would tie their hair into a topknot and crown it with a Funan-style headdress. Men continued to wear the sampot, but in many variations. The men wore a kind of collar but displayed a naked chest. A sword or dagger at the chest indicated bravery, developed musculature indicated manly strength.
Women also tied their hair into a topknot, but adorned the head with a flower. They would also crown the head with a floral circlet made of gold. They wore the sampot or a floral textile Sarong with a Pidan cloth, matched with a golden belt and held by a new style of Khmer Sarong Kor below the neck. Breasts and stomach remained naked (see the next section). The most striking development of this period is the ladies-in-waiting of the palace wearing a shawl-like sbai over the left shoulder to cover the breast and stomach in a Buddhist manner. Royal women wore a Sava, a loosely decorated band of beads worn crosswise.

Angkor Era (802—1432)
In the Khmer Empire or Angkor period, Khmer styles moved firmly away from the Indian styles of earlier periods. At the same time Khmer culture spread its influence far beyond the boundaries of the Empire. In Zhou Daguan's The Customs of Cambodia the following can be found:

Among the Khmer (excluding vast numbers of hill-tribe slaves), both men and women wore their hair tied up in a knot. All were naked to the waist with a cloth around the hips. In public, they wore a larger cloth over the smaller one. All were barefoot.

From the king down, the social distinction was marked by the quality and decoration of the cloth. Only the king was permitted to wear cloth fully patterned with flowers. His head was also wreathed with flowers when he was not wearing a Buddha-like gold crown. On his fingers and toes he wore bracelets encrusted with gold and pearls. The palms of his hands and soles of his feet were dyed crimson. He carried the gold sword of office in public.

Parasols, as extensions of clothing, were severely graded in number and gilding from the king's eight or more parasols down to a Buddhist monk's one.

The king's subjects' clothes were various reductions of the royal ensemble. Court officials and members of the royal family were permitted cloth showing a design in scattered flowers; low officials were limited to two flowers; male commoners had none, though common women were permitted to crimson their feet and hands and wear a cloth showing two flowers.

Contemporary inscriptions and bas-reliefs of the temples at Angkor, especially Angkor Wat and the Bayon, show that the "cloths" were various forms and widths of sampot, worn as skirts by women but hitched up into trousers or shorts by men for military action or labour.

Zhou Daguan reported that the common women had no hair ornaments, though some wore golden rings or bracelets and a metal belt. Beautiful girls were sent to the court to serve the king or his family; like concubines and other court servants, they wore crimson markings on the crown of the head. Temple evidence shows that women of the era, rich and poor, used a golden buckle to cover the upper body. The topknot allowed a long ponytail, worn over the shoulder.

Temple bas-reliefs show how celestial apsaras were conceived. To appear in this way to royalty, a court dancer added special ornaments to Khmer elements. The Sarong Kor was a round decorative collar, red coloured, highly visible, worn just below the neck and embellished with detailed gold-colored copper ornaments and beaded designs. The dancer added a loosely decorated band of beads worn crosswise called a  sava. Her Sompot was more highly decorated than usual, with two knots at the waist. The right knot is long but the left knot design is more charming and fashionable.

The waist has a highly ornate belt decorated with warped, spear-like tips draped on a red cloth. The most-used jewellery is at the ankle, dangling from the ears or around the wrists. Most striking of all is the apsara's crown: a tricorn headdress of finely beaten silver or gold with two or three garlands of emeralds and gold. These were worn by royal princesses, sculptured female divinities, female dancers and female musicians. Though this costume is not usually worn today, it has become part of the high culture of Cambodia in the Apsara Dance.

Angkor court ladies' dress was a little different from the court dancers'. However, bas-reliefs show the costumes of Queens Jayarajadevi and Indradevi to have a unique sava in a glittering gold floral print instead of apsara beading. Queen Indradevi's crown has ten points and a large diamond in the center holding her headdress in place.

Charktomok period (1432—1525)
()

After the fall of Angkor in 1431, the surviving Cambodians lost their awareness of the old way of living and developed new modes with more affinity to Buddhism than the former Hindu influences.

Royalty: the King wore a long-sleeved shirt sewn at the top with rich embroidery and a collar sometimes with round decorations, sometimes with little sharp tips. There was a sort of epaulette sewn onto the shirt but arching upwards like Indra's bow, a Chinese style from the Tang dynasty. Criss-crossing the front were the kse-sangvar, chains of rank forming an X as they cross over one another, on top of them a diamond-shaped pendant. Below are knee-length, leg-hugging trousers decorated at the hem, covered by a chang kben descending to the thigh and with a belt at the waist. 

Other accessories include a rectangular loin-cloth at the front and sometimes two others on the side that look like fishtails. These pieces date from the Angkor era. The King wears a crown similar to one from the Angkor period, but with sharper points and higher.

Men mostly went shirtless until they were sufficiently wealthy to find a suitable top. Ordinary Khmer males' attire was a wrap like a Chong Kben in several colours, but lifted to the thigh and strongly hugging the lower body to free it for physical work. Noblemen wore a round collared shirt with a long pleat at the front and four pockets at the side. Most males wore their hair long.

Women in this era wore highly decorated garments. Young women wrapped themselves in two metres of fabric in chាng pok style, revealing a small part of the stomach. This fabric was usually decorated with several colours and pieces of silver, made of heavy or soft cotton depend on the wearer's wealth. Wealthy women wore the chong pok with extra fabric as a shawl sewn in place to the sampot. 

They wore their hair up in a bun or as a chignon attached with flowers and draped over the shoulder. Older women wore quieter colors with their favorite sampot samloy and jewellery of bracelets, necklaces and earrings, made from silver, gold and other metal. Older women wore their hair in chignon style only.

Common women wore the same style of clothes as the upper class but in black, most wearing sarongs with no decoration or shawl except a serviceable krama.

Longvek era—Kingdom of Cambodia (1525–1953)
The history of Khmer clothing during the Longvek, Srei Santor, Oudong and the French Protectorate eras is, for the time being, scholarly terra incognita. Shifts in fashion, especially royal fashion, following French influence. Upper garments and shoes especially approximate more and more closely to European court dress, while lower garments vacillate between breeches, trousers and sampot chang kben.

Khmer Rouge period (1975–1979): black pajamas, checkered krama and Mao cap

The Khmer Rouge regime of the 1970s was well-noted for imposing black unisex pajamas. 

The typical peasant outfit consisted of a collarless black shirt, baggy trousers with an elastic waistband, and a red and white checkered krama knotted loosely about the neck. In the eastern provinces the krama was checked in blue and white. Brightly colored clothing was strictly prohibited; colors were limited to plain black, dark blue, or maroon. Women were strictly forbidden to wear Western-style trousers or jeans at any time. Female cadres wore a folded sampot or pants with an elastic band. Urban dwellers who had taken a few clothes out with them as they were forced out of Phnom Penh were quickly ordered to dye them in black using mud. Clothes shortages were common. 

The kdeb or Mao cap worn by cadres during the Khmer Rouge regime was imported from Communist China and later copied in a Cambodian factory established close to the O'Russey Market as the official clothing factory for clothing Ministry officials throughout the country. High government officials generally wore French-style black pants with straight collared long sleeve black shirts.

References

Further reading
 
 
 

History of Asian clothing
Clothing by ethnicity